Derek Austin Graham (born 3 September 1941) is a retired distance athlete from Northern Ireland. The first Northern Irish runner to break 4 minutes for the mile, he was ranked number 1 in the U.K. and Ireland over 2 miles/3000 m, 3 miles/5000 m and cross country at various periods in the 1960s.

He was selected for nine consecutive International cross country races (later to be recognised as the World Cross country), finishing second in 1966 in Rabat, Morocco.  He competed in the 1964 Tokyo Olympics for Great Britain, finishing seventh in his initial heat for the 5000m race. He also competed in the 1966 European Championships, and the 1966 and 1970 Commonwealth Games.  He was the Irish record holder for various distances through this time.  At the 1970 Commonwealth Games, Graham picked up a virus which later developed into myalgic encephalomyelitis, ultimately ending his athletics career.

Personal bests

References 
 Derek Graham Interview
 Derek Graham's profile at Sports Reference.com

1941 births
Living people
Male middle-distance runners from Northern Ireland
Male long-distance runners from Northern Ireland
Olympic athletes of Great Britain
Athletes (track and field) at the 1964 Summer Olympics
Commonwealth Games competitors for Northern Ireland
Athletes (track and field) at the 1966 British Empire and Commonwealth Games
Athletes (track and field) at the 1970 British Commonwealth Games
People with chronic fatigue syndrome